Peter Yeo (born 22 May 1947) is a former Australian rules footballer who played with Melbourne in the Victorian Football League (VFL).

References

External links 

1947 births
Living people
Australian rules footballers from South Australia
Melbourne Football Club players
Sturt Football Club players